Sam Wang may refer to:

Sam Wang (neuroscientist), American neuroscientist and founder of the Princeton Election Consortium
Sam Wang (actor) (born 1976), Taiwanese actor, singer, and model